Rajneesh Harvansh Singh is an Indian politician and a member of the Indian National Congress party.

Political career
He became an MLA in 2013.

Personal life
He is married to Neetu Singh and has one son and one daughter. Singh was booked for cheating in a land purchase case in 2010 along with his father Harvansh Singh and others.

See also
Madhya Pradesh Legislative Assembly
2013 Madhya Pradesh Legislative Assembly election

References

External links

Indian National Congress politicians from Madhya Pradesh
Living people
1970 births
Indian National Congress politicians